Bernice Bediako Poku, known professionally as Abena Rockstar, is a Ghanaian rapper and songwriter from Kumasi.

Music career
In 2014, she recorded a music project named ‘Only Few Can Relate,’ which she simultaneously released in April 2017 with her ‘May All Fears inside Abort’ EP. Abena is associated with cutting edges lyrics about life and the realities of living.

In September 2017, her eponymous single, ‘Abena’, was selected for study at the Department of African Studies at Howard University in the USA. At the start of 2018, a Swedish television station, Sveriges Television featured Abena Rockstar in their documentary about Ghanaian hiphop.

Abena Rockstar released her debut album, the Harvest Season LP, in March 2019.

Abena Rockstar has performed on the stage of the Chale Wote Street Art Festival in Ghana in 2017. Abena performed at Asa Baako Festival in Busia in the Western Region (Ghana).

Discography

References

Living people
Ghanaian rappers
Musicians from Kumasi
Year of birth missing (living people)